Don't Say a Word is a 2001 American psychological thriller film starring Michael Douglas, Brittany Murphy and Sean Bean based on the novel Don't Say a Word by Andrew Klavan. It was directed by Gary Fleder and written by Anthony Peckham and Patrick Smith Kelly. It was released on September 28, 2001, receiving negative reviews from critics and grossing $100 million against its $50 million budget.

Plot
In 1991, a gang of thieves steal a rare $10-million gem, but, in the process, two of the gang double-cross their leader, Patrick Koster, and take off with the precious stone.

Ten years later, on the day before Thanksgiving, prominent Manhattan private practice child psychiatrist, Dr. Nathan R. Conrad, is invited by his friend and former colleague, Dr. Louis Sachs, to examine a "disturbed" young lady named Elisabeth Burrows at the state sanatorium.

Having been released from prison two weeks earlier, Patrick and the remaining gang members break into an apartment which overlooks Nathan's apartment, where he lives with his wife Aggie and daughter Jessie. Nathan is informed by Patrick that Elisabeth is only pretending to be insane to hide out in the institution from this gang that is searching for the gem. That evening, Patrick kidnaps Jessie as a means of forcing Nathan to acquire a six-digit number from Elisabeth's memory. As Nathan visits Elisabeth, she is reluctant at first, but he gains her trust laterespecially when he reveals the situation with Jessie. Sachs admits to Nathan that the gang who kidnapped Jessie also kidnapped his girlfriend to force him to acquire the number from Elisabeth. Sachs is then visited by Detective Sandra Cassidy, who reveals to him that his girlfriend has been found dead. Meanwhile, Aggie hears Jessie's voice and realizes the kidnappers reside in the nearby apartment. The kidnappers send one of them to kill Aggie while the others escape with Jessie, but Aggie sets an ambush and kills him.

After Nathan takes Elisabeth out of the sanatorium, she remembers certain events regarding the gang. It is revealed that Elisabeth's father was the gang member who double crossed the others and kept the gem. However, other members of the gang later found him and ordered him to reveal where he had hidden the gem, subsequently pushing him in front of a subway train. The gang members were arrested immediately, and Elisabeth escaped with her doll in which the gem was hidden. She also remembers that the required number, 815508, is the number of her father's grave at Hart Island and that her doll is placed beside him in the coffin. She explains that she had stowed away on a boat that was taking her father's coffin for burial in Potter's field on Hart Island, where the gravediggers put the doll, named Mischka, inside.

Nathan and Elisabeth steal a boat to reach Hart Island. The gang members track them down and demand that Nathan give them the number they want. Elisabeth reveals the number and Patrick orders his companion to exhume her father's coffin after releasing Jessie. He finds the doll and the gem hidden inside it. He then decides to kill Nathan and Elisabeth, but Cassidy arrives before he can shoot them. Patrick's companion is shot by Cassidy, but Patrick manages to wound her. Taking advantage of the confusion, Nathan takes the gem from Patrick and throws it into an open mass grave. Nathan kicks Patrick into the grave, and then triggers a collapse of its sides, filling the grave with dirt and burying Patrick alive. Nathan reunites with Aggie and Jessie, thanks Cassidy, and invites Elisabeth to live with them.

Cast

Production
An earlier version of the script did not feature the investigation side-plot set around Detective Sandra Cassidy. Although the film is entirely set in New York, shooting took place in winter 2000 in both New York and Toronto. Due to the film's release nearly three weeks after the September 11 attacks, the filmmakers contemplated delaying the movie, but ultimately decided against it. However, they cut out and replaced shots of the World Trade Center from the edit, such as the opening shot, which now instead shows Brooklyn.

Soundtrack
The film's musical score was composed by Mark Isham. The soundtrack was released on CD from Varèse Sarabande that contains eight score selections from various scenes, including Heist, Kidnapped and the horrific events at Subway.

Reception

Critical response

Don't Say a Word received poor reviews from critics.  

Roger Ebert of the Chicago Sun-Times gave the film two and a half stars out of four, deeming that "the movie as a whole looks and occasionally plays better than it is" and praising Gary Fleder's "poetic visual touch" as well as Brittany Murphy's and Sky McCole Bartusiak's performances. Conversely, in his review for Empire, Kim Newman found the film bland and thought it "rarely manages to make you forget its blatant silliness". He did however praise the female cast, in particular Famke Janssen.

Box office
The film earned over $100 million worldwide against a budget of $50 million.

References

External links

 
 

2001 films
2001 crime thriller films
2001 psychological thriller films
2000s heist films
20th Century Fox films
American crime thriller films
American heist films
American psychological thriller films
Films about kidnapping
Films about post-traumatic stress disorder
Films based on American crime novels
Films directed by Gary Fleder
Films produced by Arnold Kopelson
Films scored by Mark Isham
Films set in 1991
Films set in 2001
Films set in Manhattan
Films set in psychiatric hospitals
Films shot in Toronto
Impact of the September 11 attacks on cinema
2000s Italian-language films
Regency Enterprises films
Thanksgiving in films
Village Roadshow Pictures films
2000s English-language films
Films produced by Arnon Milchan
2000s American films